The Jefferson Memorial Forest is a forest located in southwest Louisville, Kentucky, in the Knobs region of Kentucky.  At , it is the largest municipal urban forest in the United States.

The forest was established as a tribute to Kentucky's veterans, and was designated as a National Audubon Society wildlife refuge.

Facilities

The forest offers over 35 miles (50 km) of various hiking trails, including several which offer views of downtown Louisville. Several discrete usage areas are featured, including the Tom Wallace Recreation Area, with the  Tom Wallace Lake; the Paul Yost Recreation Area, and the Horine Conference Center.  Camping and fishing are both permitted. Tom Wallace Lake is stocked with trout and catfish twice a year.  Tom Wallace Recreation Area features various handicapped-accessible facilities, including a fishing dock and a -long natural trail, the Tuliptree Trail.  The Horine Conference Center is a popular field trip destination for Louisville schools.

The forest property is operated as parkland by Louisville Metro Government.

A hiking trail, the Siltstone Trail, traverses much of the forest from east to west. There are several local hiking trails, in addition. Horine also features many hiking trails and both the Paul Yost and Tom Wallace Recreation Areas have horse trails. No mountain biking is permitted in the forest at this time, but the low traffic roads and hilly terrain afford road cyclists many challenging routes through the forest and surrounding areas.

History

In 1946, Jefferson County, Kentucky, undertook to establish a working forest preserve in the southern part of the county. The Jefferson County Memorial Forest was originally envisioned to be  and was named as a memorial to the area's dead of World War II. Since then, the forest has been redesignated to remember all who served in the armed forces. The original purchases were guided by Paul Yost, who was appointed as the county forester. No further properties were purchased until a single tract was acquired in 1965. Since then, acquisition has proceeded again slowly.

In the late 1990s, the old ranger station, a former country schoolhouse, was renovated as a visitor and welcome center.

On May 30, 2004 parts of the park were ravaged by a tornado, which caused several trails to be temporarily closed.

Natural history

There are some fifty types of trees, including ten species of oaks, and a rich flora of wildflowers and seventeen species of ferns and fern allies. A wide variety of animals can be seen, including bobcats, coyotes, red foxes, white-tailed deer, great blue herons and horned owls.

Like many other natural areas in the eastern United States, the forest has a significant problem with invasive exotics, including tree-of-heaven (Ailanthus altissima), autumn olive (Eleagnus umbellata), Amur honeysuckle (Lonicera maackii), Japanese honeysuckle (Lonicera japonica), and princess tree (Paulownia tomentosa).

The forest is located in the Knobs region of Kentucky, also known as the Muldraugh Escarpment.  This is a belt of rugged hills lying between the Bluegrass and the Pennyrile regions.  The underlying geology of these hills is primarily siltstone and shale, with the siltstone creating extremely steep hillsides.  The most important of these in the forest area is the Holtzclaw Siltstone, named after Holsclaw Hill.

See also

 The Parklands of Floyds Fork
 List of parks in the Louisville metropolitan area
 List of attractions and events in the Louisville metropolitan area
 City of Parks
 Valley of the Drums, a toxic waste dump near Jefferson Memorial Forest

References

External links
 Jefferson Memorial Forest website
 The Parklands of Floyds Fork website
 21st Century Parks website 
 Louisville Olmsted Parks Conservancy website

Parks in Louisville, Kentucky
Military monuments and memorials in the United States
Urban forests in the United States
Forests of Kentucky
Protected areas established in 1946
1946 establishments in Kentucky